Love, Math and Sex is a 1997 French drama film directed by Charlotte Silvera. It was screened in the Contemporary World Cinema section of the 1997 Toronto International Film Festival.

Cast
 Julie Delarme as Sabine
 Georges Corraface as Jiri
 Marie-Christine Barrault as the mathematics teacher
 Agnès Soral as Sabine’s mother
 Christophe Malavoy as Sabine’s father

References

External links
 

1997 films
1997 drama films
French drama films
1990s French-language films
1990s French films